Viper is the name of four supervillains appearing in American comic books published by Marvel Comics. The first version Jordan Stryke first appeared in Captain America #157 (January 1973), created by Steve Englehart, Steve Gerber, Sal Buscema and John Verpoorten. Ophelia Sarkissian is the second version, and a third version appears in recent years.

Publication history
The first version (Jordan Stryke) was created by Steve Englehart, Steve Gerber, Sal Buscema and John Verpoorten, and first appeared in Captain America #157 (January 1973).

The third version was created by Ed Brubaker and Steve Epting, and first appeared in Captain America (Vol. 5) #28 (September 2007).

Fictional character biography

Jordan Stryke

Jordan Stryke (a.k.a. Jordan Dixon) is the first version of Viper. He was the brother of Leopold Stryke, also known as the costumed criminal Eel. They each formed costumed identities without the other realizing this fact.  Viper concealed this fact by using the alias of "Dixon" as his everyday last name. Together they joined the Crime Wave of the Cowled Commander, and the Viper battled the Falcon and Captain America. During the course of the fight, Viper managed to poison his opponents with darts and escaped. Later, the Falcon discovered the Viper in his home after tracking his alias (through an offhand comment made by the Viper indicating that he was involved in advertising) and captured him. Escaping in an ensuing battle with Plantman and the rest of the Crime Wave, Viper's identity was discovered by his brother Eel. Soon after, the Crime Wave was defeated by Captain America and the Falcon, and they were sent to prison.

Later escaping prison with his brother and the help of the Cobra, the trio formed the original Serpent Squad and attacked Captain America at his girlfriend's home in Virginia.  Despite new weapons added to his arsenal, including the Venom-Firer and prosthetic fangs, the Viper and his partners were returned to jail. While in custody, he was being taken to appear before a grand jury by U.S. Marshals. The van he was transported in was attacked by Madame Hydra, and his guards were killed. Believing himself rescued by his Serpent Squad, Viper rushed out of the van, only to be told by Madame Hydra that she wanted a new name – his name.  Despite offering to change his moniker, the Viper was gunned down and killed, and Madame Hydra assumed the name and leadership of the Serpent Squad. Later, his soul fragment was discovered by Hell's Angel and the X-Men in Mephisto’s realm and, with Jordan Stryke's usual luck, even this was destroyed.

As part of the "All-New, All-Different Marvel", Viper somehow turned up alive and has assembled the other snake-themed villains to join the Serpent Society under its new name of Serpent Solutions.

Viper appears in the 2017 "Secret Empire" storyline where he and the rest of the Serpent Society are among the villains recruited by Baron Helmut Zemo to join the Army of Evil.

During the "Hunted" storyline, Viper and his fellow Serpent Society members were captured by Taskmaster and Black Ant for Kraven the Hunter's "Great Hunt" sponsored by Arcade's company Arcade Industries.

Ophelia Sarkissian

Ophelia Sarkissian is the second version of Viper. She is a foe of the Avengers and the X-Men.

Viper (Serpent Squad)
A third version of Viper appeared along with Sin's new Serpent Squad in the pages of Captain America. His true identity has yet to be revealed. He breaks Crossbones out of jail and later attacked the White House, but he was stopped by Captain America. Following that, he and the rest of the Squad took part in a plot to use madbombs to cause rioting in New York City. After being captured, Viper asked to go into the Witness Protection Program in exchange for information. He had only been in the program for less than a month when he was targeted by the villain killer Scourge and killed after being shot twice in the head.

Hobgoblin's Viper
Roderick Kingsley sold one of Ophelia Sarkissian's Viper outfits to an unnamed criminal in order to be a version of Viper.

Powers and abilities
The first version has no superhuman abilities, and relies upon his mind and trained fighting skills to win battles. Very intelligent, he is a skilled debater and advertiser, and he is skilled enough in chemistry to create his own special form of venom. He wears venom-tipped claws and employs venom-tipped darts.

The third version possessed great physical strength but was lacking in hand-to-hand combat skills. In battles with both Steve Rogers and Bucky Barnes, he was taken out easily by a kick to the head. He used a wrist blaster that could fire poison darts.

Other versions
During the 2017 Secret Wars storyline, the Battleworld domain of the Hydra Empire has a group called the Vipers, a group of female assassins that wear Hydra's version of Symbiotes on their bodies and are led by Venom. The Vipers first appeared with Venom where they attacked the Resistance. Ellie Rogers, the daughter of Steve Rogers and Sharon Carter, escapes while most of the Resistance was killed but Venom managed to infect Ellie with a Symbiote which slowly started to turn her into a Viper, however, uses these abilities to help Nomad.

In other media
 A variation of Viper appeared in Nick Fury: Agent of S.H.I.E.L.D. (1998) as an alias for Andrea von Strucker (portrayed by Sandra Hess).
 A variation of Viper under the alias of Dr. Green appears in The Wolverine (2013), portrayed by Svetlana Khodchenkova. This version is a mutant who is immune to all toxins on Earth, able to shed her skin if she is ever infected, and is a brilliant scientist. She assists in Ichiro Yashida's plot to steal Wolverine's healing factor, only to be killed by Yukio.
 A variation the Hydra Symbiote Vipers called the Carnage Queen appears in the Ultimate Spider-Man episode "The Symbiote Saga" Pt. 3 with Mary Jane Watson (voiced by Tara Strong) as a host.

References

External links
 
 
 

Characters created by Sal Buscema
Characters created by Steve Englehart
Characters created by Steve Gerber
Comics characters introduced in 1973
Fictional advertising executives
Fictional crime bosses
Fictional mercenaries in comics
Fictional terrorists
Marvel Comics male supervillains
Marvel Comics martial artists